Martin Hyder (born 1961) is an English actor and writer.

Profile
Hyder was educated at Abingdon School leaving in 1980. He has worked closely with the BBC since 2000 contributing and appearing in BBC Radio and BBC Television. His television credits include The Lenny Henry Show, The Omid Djalili Show, Ruddy Hell! It’s Harry and Paul, Harry Hill's TV Burp and he has appeared on many successful BBC radio shows.

In addition he has appeared on stage and in film, most recently he had a role in the 2014 film Edge of Tomorrow and performed on stage in the plays 'Dead Dog in a Suitcase' in 2015 and 'My Brilliant Friend' at the Rose Theatre, Kingston in 2017.

Selected television and film
Edge of Tomorrow 
The Harry Hill Movie
Harry Hill's TV Burp
The Omid Djalili Show
Ruddy Hell! It’s Harry and Paul
The Lenny Henry Show
The Secret Show
Big Train
15 Storeys High
The 11 O'Clock Show
How Do You Want Me?

Selected radio
The Hudson and Pepperdine Show
Linda Smith's A Brief History of Timewasting
The Sunday Format
The Mark Steel Lectures
Harry Hill's Fruit Corner
Clare in the Community
Ed Reardon's Week
Life,Death and Sex with Mike and Sue

See also
 List of Old Abingdonians

References

1961 births
Living people
People educated at Abingdon School